The discography of Laura Izibor, an Irish R&B musician, recording artist and producer, consists of one studio album, three extended plays, four singles and three music videos. Born and raised in Dublin, Izibor began writing songs as a 13-year-old and in 2003, she won a songwriting competition organised by Raidió Teilifís Éireann (RTÉ). Her winning song, "Compatible", received heavy airplay on RTÉ 2fm and was the basis of a short documentary film broadcast on national television. Aged 17, Izibor signed to Jive Records and dropped out of school to record her debut studio album; however, after a dispute with the record label, she signed with Atlantic Records and relocated to New York City, United States to complete the recording. Due to long-term recording sessions in Ireland and the US, Izibor released two EPs, Live from Crawdaddy, Dublin (2007) and iTunes Festival: London 2008 (2008), on Atlantic and was featured on various film soundtracks. Let the Truth Be Told, her debut studio album, was released in 2009 after a four-year production process. The album, and its four singles, received widespread critical acclaim and charted in Ireland, the United Kingdom, the US, France, Japan and the Netherlands. Three of the album's singles—"From My Heart to Yours", "Don't Stay" and "If Tonight is My Last"—placed in the US Billboard Hot R&B/Hip-Hop Songs chart. Let the Truth Be Told was later nominated for the 2009 Choice Music Prize and earned Izibor a BET Award nomination for Best UK/Irish Act.

In August 2012, Izibor released a three-track EP The Brooklyn Sessions, Vol. 1, which contained new material. A month earlier, she announced in Metromix that her second studio album, Love, Learn, Live, which "has a little more attitude", was in production and due for release in 2012. As of September 2019, the album remains unreleased.

Albums

Studio albums

Extended plays

Singles

Music videos

Collaborations

Other appearances

References

External links

Discographies of Irish artists
Pop music discographies
Rhythm and blues discographies
Soul music discographies